The Steamship Historical Society of America (SSHSA) is a non-profit organization that was founded in 1935 as a means of bringing together amateur and professional maritime historians in the waning years of steamboat services in the northeastern United States. The interests of SSHSA have since expanded to encompass engine-powered vessels throughout North America and worldwide, both inland and deep sea. SSHSA was incorporated in the Commonwealth of Virginia in 1950 and is currently headquartered in Warwick, Rhode Island, United States.

SSHSA's quarterly illustrated journal, Steamboat Bill, has been published continuously since 1940 and is the oldest publication in its field. In the 2010 the historical society updated their magazine's lay-out and title to better encompass their mission and content, renaming the publication PowerShips. It publishes original, authoritative articles about steamships and other vessels past and present. Also included are regional and international reports about present vessels, shipping, and cruising. Reviews of the latest and best maritime books are featured as well. SSHSA also publishes books and allied material on the history of engine-powered vessels.

Membership activities include two national meetings each year in the United States and Canada where maritime activity has been important, including trips on active historic vessels when possible. Special cruise opportunities are also offered on both inland and ocean waters. Several local chapters are active around the United States which hold meetings, programs, and outings for their members.

See also
 Maritime history of the United States

Further reading
 Providence Business News article about the Image Porthole project
 Providence Business News article about the new SSHSA director
 Press Release for 75th Anniversary Celebration, 2010
 Providence Journal article about SSHSA's new Ship History Center, 2014

External links
 SSHSA Web Site
 SSHSA Image Porthole
 SSHSA E-Commerce Store

Steamships
Historical societies of the United States
Organizations established in 1935
Maritime history of the United States